Many Europeans struggle to find affordable housing. The issue is especially bad in many urban areas, where 70% of the EU's population lives. Lack of affordable housing impairs the quality of life for many people. Long commutes reduce quality for life and increase carbon emissions for people travelling by car. Lack of high-quality housing increases the social divide, causing public health problems, poor public safety, lack of workers in central locations, inefficient labour markets and other issues. Almost half of all European residential buildings were constructed pre-1970 when energy consumption in materials, standards and techniques was not considered. The European Commission found that 75% of buildings and housing need to be made more energy-efficient to meet climate goals. Zumtobel Group, an Austrian lighting company is researching more efficient lighting and light management to use lighting systems only when needed. In 2019, the European Investment Bank approved loans to broaden the company's research into connecting lighting to digital services. In both Sweden and Poland, there is a dramatically increasing demand for affordable housing in mid-size cities. Sweden is building thousands of affordable rental homes with near-zero energy use and the highest efficiency standards, the European Investment Bank approved a nearly €300 million loan in September 2019 to support this work. In the Polish city of Poznań, many residents do not qualify for city-supported affordable housing due to their high incomes but are unable to buy a home in the regular market because of low credit rating. The city and a local housing company began a project for these residents to build more than 1 000 flats that also have a kindergarten, day-care centre, a playground and parking spaces for people with disabilities. The European Investment Bank provided a €34 million loan for this project.

In 2015, more than 4 out of every 10 persons (42.0%) in the EU-28 lived in flats, close to one quarter (24.1%) in semi-detached  houses and one third (33.3%) in detached houses. The proportion of people living in flats was highest, among the EU Member States, in Spain (65.9%), Latvia (65.0%) and Estonia (62.6%), while the highest proportions of people living in semi-detached houses were reported in the Netherlands, the United Kingdom (both 59.9%) and Ireland (51.6%); these were the only Member States where more than half of the population lived in a semi-detached house. The share of people living in detached houses peaked in Croatia (73.4%), Slovenia (65.1%), Hungary (62.1%) and Romania (60.1%); Serbia (66.1%) and Norway (61.2%) also reported that more than 6 out of every 10 persons in of their population were living in detached houses.

Data 

Data as of 2007 except: Switzerland where the data is from 2009 and "detached houses" data, which is from 2018. 

Since 2010, the percentage of those living in detached houses across the EU 27 has remained stable, with the percentage of those living in detached houses remaining in the range of 34.5% to 35.8%. The only region of Europe with a distinctive trend is  the Nordic countries, where the percentage of those living in detached houses is in steady decline. The percentage of those living in detached houses in Norway, Denmark, Sweden, and Iceland, fell from 63%, 59%, 48%, and 36% to 58%, 54%, 44%, and 32% respectively. The only Nordic country resistant to this trend is Finland, where the percentage of those living in detached houses has remained stable in the 47.6% to 46.1% range. 

In the period of 2010 to 2018, the country in the EU 27 with the greatest percent decrease in those living in detached houses was Luxembourg, with a decrease from 43.3% to 34.7%. The greatest percentage increase was to Romania, where the percentage of those living in detached houses increased from 60.8% to 65.2%.

Lack of affordable housing 
Lack of affordable housing impairs the quality of life for many people. Long commutes reduce quality for life and increase carbon emissions for people travelling by car. it also increases the social divide, causing public health problems, poor public safety, lack of workers in central locations, inefficient labour markets and other issues.

Funding 
In both Sweden and Poland, there is a dramatically increasing demand for affordable housing in mid-size cities. Sweden is 
building thousands of affordable rental homes with near-zero energy use and the highest efficiency standards, the European Investment Bank approved a nearly €300 million loan in September 2019 to support this work. In the Polish city of Poznań, many residents do not qualify for city-supported affordable housing due to their high incomes but are unable to buy a home in the regular market because of low credit rating. The city and a local housing company began a project for these residents to build more than 1,000 flats that also have a kindergarten, day-care centre, a playground and parking spaces for people with disabilities. The European Investment Bank provided a €34 million loan for this project.

In Tallinn, a recently established network of 19 European communities are aiming to raise the standard of living for their population while lessening their environmental footprint. The city is receiving a €100 million loan as support from the European Investment Bank, in order to upgrade public spaces, schools, social housing and energy efficient measures.

In 2022, Polish bank BGK will get a €133 million loan to help fund social and affordable homes across the country. The project is set to produce 5,000 new and 500 restored housing units across Poland, with the majority located in cohesion regions.

Energy efficiency 
There is a shortage of energy-efficient homes in Europe, the issue is especially bad in many urban areas, where 70% of the EU's population lives. Almost half of all European residential buildings were constructed pre-1970, when energy consumption in materials, standards and techniques was not considered. The European Commission found that 75% of buildings and housing need to be made more energy efficient to meet climate goals.

References

External links
 http://europa.eu/rapid/pressReleasesAction.do?reference=STAT/09/95&format=HTML&aged=1&language=EN&guiLanguage=en
 http://epp.eurostat.ec.europa.eu/cache/ITY_OFFPUB/KS-SF-11-004/EN/KS-SF-11-004-EN.PDF
 http://epp.eurostat.ec.europa.eu/cache/ITY_PUBLIC/3-23022011-BP/EN/3-23022011-BP-EN.PDF
 http://www.stat.fi/tk/el/echp_national_characteristics_remain_in_housing.pdf
 http://ec.europa.eu/eurostat/statistics-explained/images/d/da/Distribution_of_population_by_dwelling_type%2C_2018_%28%25%29_SILC20.png
 https://appsso.eurostat.ec.europa.eu/nui/submitViewTableAction.do
 https://ec.europa.eu/eurostat/statistics-explained/index.php/Housing_statistics